= MGM Studios =

MGM Studios may refer to:

- Metro-Goldwyn-Mayer, an American film and television company
  - Amazon MGM Studios, the parent company of the above
- Disney's Hollywood Studios, an American theme park formerly known as Disney–MGM Studios
